Metallate or metalate is the name given to any complex anion containing a metal ligated to several atoms or small groups.

Typically, the metal will be one of the transition elements and the ligand will be oxygen or another chalcogenide or a cyanide group (though others are known). The chalcogenide metallates are known as oxometallates, thiometallates, selenometallates and tellurometallates; the cyanide metallates are known as cyanometallates.

Oxometallates include permanganate, chromate and vanadate ( or ).

Thiometallates include tetrathiovanadate, tetrathiomolybdate, tetrathiotungstate and similar ions.

Cyanometallates include ferricyanide and ferrocyanide.

Metallate is also used as a verb by bioinorganic chemistry to describe the act of adding metal atoms or ions to a site (synthetic ligand or protein).

References

Anions
Metallates